Safika Holdings (PTY) Limited www.safika.co.za is a South African investment holding company headed by Nelson Mandela's fellow political prisoners Sakumzi 'Saki' Macozoma and Moss Ngoasheng.  The company was founded in 1995.
 
In 2003, when the South African government decreed that major businesses must ensure a certain percentage of their shareholding be held by black people Safika became the preferred Black Economic Empowerment (BEE) partner for a number of prominent South African companies. From its headquarters in Johannesburg Safika manages widespread international investments.

Safika has interests in financial services, mining, agriculture, gaming, aerospace, property and communication. The company has close ties with the Standard Bank Group, Africa's largest banking group by assets and earnings. In 2004 Standard took shares in Safika which in turn acquired a stake in Standard. In 2005 Standard increased its shareholding in Safika to 20 per cent.

In 2010 Safika expanded its operations to Australia taking a stake in the Wingate Group, a privately held investment company. Among its other investments, it is now a partner in Brisbane Valley Protein (BVP,) a multi-million rand protein production hub that is being developed on more than 1100 hectares at Coominya in Australia’s Brisbane Valley. It produces commercial quantities of chickens, quails and pasture-and-corn-fed beef. BVP has identified the growing Asian middle class as a prime market for speciality protein.

Safika is the controlling shareholder in Ntsimbintle Mining (PTY) Ltd. which, in 2012, through its subsidiary Tshipi Manganese Mining (PTY) Limited, created a multi-billion rand manganese mine called Tshipi Borwa in South Africa's Northern Cape. Tshipi is now the largest exporter of manganese in Africa.

Key personnel
Sakumzi 'Saki' Macozoma and Moss Ngoasheng, leading South African businessmen, are Safika's controlling shareholders.

Sakumi 'Saki' Macozoma Saki Macozoma
Safika's non-executive chairman, is one of the best known business people in South Africa. He is board chairman of Vodacom, a director of Volkswagen SA, a former chairman of financial institutions STANLIB and Liberty Life, former deputy chairman of the Standard Bank of South Africa. He is a former chairman of the President's Big Business Working Group, former co-chair of the Business Trust, former Chairman of the Council on Higher Education, chairman of the University Council of the University of the Witwatersrand and a member of the Board of Governors of Rhodes University. He is the chairman of the Kwazulu–Natal Philharmonic Orchestra.

Macozoma served five years as a political prisoner on Robben Island alongside Nelson Mandela and later became a prominent figure in the African National Congress (ANC) serving as a member of parliament and as a member of the ANC's executive committee. In 2009 Macozoma left the ANC saying the ruling party could no longer carry the hopes of the South African people and for a short time joined the opposition political grouping, Congress of the People (COPE). He is now politically unaffiliated.

Moss Ngoasheng
Moss Ngoasheng served eight years as a political prisoner alongside Nelson Mandela. After his release in 1985 he obtained a scholarship to study at the University of Sussex in England and then returned to South Africa to teach at the University of Natal.

From 1995 to 2000 he served as economic advisor in the South African Presidency. For a number of years he also served on the African National Congress's (ANC's) economic policy unit. He consulted to the World Bank and National Housing Forum (South Africa) on aspects of economic policy in South Africa. He is chairman of the board of the COEGA Development Corporation, Coega, and of The Kelly Group, a human resource and skills provider group listed on the Johannesburg Stock Exchange, JSE,. He is a board member of Dimension Data (Middle East and Africa), Hot Slots Gaming Enterprises, Safika Resources, Tshipi e Ntle Manganese Mining, Ntsimbintle Mining, South African Breweries, The Wingate Group, Winsaf and Business Leadership South Africa. He is a member of Harvard University's Index of African Governance Advisory Council.

Marc Ber
Ber is a shareholder, director and chief financial officer of Safika Holdings and holds board positions in some of Safika's investments. He is also in charge of Safika's Australian activities.

A chartered accountant by training, he has worked with the Safika group since soon after its inception. His responsibilities encompass every stage of a transaction from assessment of its viability, through determining the most effective structure from an operational, legal and tax perspective to managing the transaction's implementation. In line with Safika's investment policy, once a transaction is concluded he remains intensively involved.

References

Investment management companies of South Africa
Holding companies of South Africa
South African businesspeople